Tulloch Airfield  is an airstrip serving the town of Bog Walk in the Saint Catherine Parish of Jamaica.

There is high terrain south through east of the airstrip.

See also

Transport in Jamaica
List of airports in Jamaica

References

External links
OpenStreetMap - Tulloch Airfield
HERE Maps - Tulloch Airfield

Airports in Jamaica